Mount Ogden is a peak in Weber County, Utah, United States in the northern Wasatch Range.

The peak is popular with hikers and can be accessed via trails in three nearby canyons: Beus, Waterfall, and Taylor Canyons. The summit's eastern face also has technical crack and face climbing routes. The summit accommodates several large radio towers and a helipad.

Mount Ogden's eastern slope is home to Snowbasin Ski Resort, where the 2002 Olympics downhill ski races were held. The resort also provides private road access to the peak.

References

External links

 
 

Mountains of Utah
Landforms of Weber County, Utah
Ogden, Utah
Wasatch Range